The 2016–17 Northern Kentucky Norse men's basketball team represented Northern Kentucky University (NKU) during the 2016–17 NCAA Division I men's basketball season. The Norse, led by second-year head coach John Brannen, played their home games at BB&T Arena in Highland Heights, Kentucky as members of the Horizon League. They finished the season 24–11, 13–6 in Horizon League play to finish in a tie for third place. As the No. 4 seed in the Horizon League tournament, they defeated Wright State, Youngstown State, and Milwaukee to win the Horizon League tournament. They received the conference's automatic bid to the NCAA tournament in the school's first year of eligibility after its transition to a Division I school. They lost in the first round to Kentucky.

Previous season
The Norse finished the 2015–16 season 9–21, 5–13 in Horizon League play to finish in eighth place. They lost in the first round of the Horizon League tournament to Milwaukee.

Offseason

Departures

Incoming transfers

Recruiting class of 2016

Roster

Schedule and results

|-
!colspan=9 style=| Exhibition

|-
!colspan=9 style=| Non-conference regular season

|-
!colspan=9 style=| Horizon League regular season

|-
!colspan=9 style=|Horizon League tournament

|-
!colspan=9 style=|NCAA tournament

References

Northern Kentucky Norse men's basketball seasons
Northern Kentucky
Northern Kentucky
Northern Kentucky
Northern Kentucky